"It Couldn't Have Been Any Better" is a country music song written by Ray Griff, and made famous by Johnny Duncan.

One of several Duncan singles to feature session vocalist Janie Fricke on harmony vocals, "It Couldn't Have Been Any Better" was his second No. 1 song to top the Billboard Hot Country Singles chart, doing so in April 1977. The single week atop the country chart was part of an 11-week run in the top 40.

Although the last Duncan-Fricke duet to top the charts — the previous song, "Thinkin' of a Rendezvous," went No. 1 just before Christmas 1976 — the two enjoyed several more duet hits, most notably "Come a Little Bit Closer" in January 1978 (a cover of the Jay and the Americans).

Charts

Weekly charts

Year-end charts

References

1977 singles
Johnny Duncan (country singer) songs
Song recordings produced by Billy Sherrill
Songs written by Ray Griff
1976 songs
Columbia Records singles